The TI-54 was a scientific calculator produced by Texas Instruments, primarily marketed towards engineers and science professionals. It was introduced in 1981, and at the time was the only calculator that could deal with complex numbers. It was discontinued in 1983.

The TI-54 touted features such as "built in algebraic functions for both real and complex numbers", "hyperbolic and trig functions for real numbers", and conversion functions such as polar to rectangular, and degrees/minutes/seconds to decimal degrees. It also came with Texas Instruments' Constant Memory feature, which allowed for data storage even after the calculator was turned off.

References

External links
Datamath Calculator Museum

Texas Instruments calculators